Stictane parvipectinata is a moth in the family Erebidae. It was described by Jeremy Daniel Holloway in 2001. It is found on Borneo.

The length of the forewings is 6–7 mm.

References

Moths described in 2001
Nudariina